Sokgot is a collective noun for various types of traditional Korean undergarments. They were worn as part of a hanbok before the import of Western-style underwear. Women usually wore several layers of undergarments, the more layers they had the richer they were. Undergarments were considered very important, thus it happened that the quality and material of the underwear was better than that of the visible outer layers.

Types
There were several types of sokgot: underskirts were generally named sokchima, while underpants were referred to as sokbaji. Under a jeogori, sokjeoksam and sokjeogori were worn.

A clothing item similar in function to today's panties was called dari sokgot, which was a wide band of cloth pulled through in between the legs and tied with ribbons at the waist. Above this came the lowest layer of underskirts, called soksokgot. One of these layers was a mujigi chima, which itself was sewn of several layers at knee-length, its function was to give shape and volume to the chima, raising it. Above this a daesyum chima was added. Noble women also wore a noreunbaji, a kind of additional underpants.

Male undergarments were significantly simpler, under the pants a pair of sokgoui, underpants were worn, while jeoksam came under the jeogori in winter, and was worn on its own in summer.

References

External links
 Photo of a sokjeoksam
 Photo of a soksokgot
 Photo of a mujigi chima
 Photo of a daesyum chima

Korean clothing
Undergarments